Thalikottai Rasuthevar Baalu Rajaa  better known as Dr. T. R. B. Rajaa is an Indian Tamil politician. He won the 2011, 2016 and the 2021 Tamil Nadu Legislative Assembly Elections representing DMK in Mannargudi. He holds the position of the party's IT Wing Secretary.

Education 
He graduated from the University of Madras in a masters in Psychology. He successfully defended his research thesis and was awarded a Doctorate in Philosophy (PhD) in Counselling Psychology and Management (Inter-Disciplinary) from Vels University.

Political career 
Rajaa has been elected thrice to the Tamil Nadu Legislative Assembly from Mannargudi. He was appointed the first secretary of  DMK's NRI Wing and then as the 2nd Secretary of the DMK's IT Wing  after its former secretary and Finance Minister of Tamilnadu PTR had resigned from the post due to governmental work load. After DMK came back to power in 2021, Rajaa was appointed a member in the Tamil Nadu State Planning Commission and as the Chairman of the Legislative Committee on Estimates by the CM Thiru. M K Stalin. He was also declared as the Substitute Speaker of the Assembly by the Speaker of TN Legislative Assembly Thiru. M Appavu.

Offices held/holding 
 MLA of Mannargudi: 2011–present
 Secretary of DMK IT Wing: 2022–present 
Substitute Speaker of the TN Legislative Assembly: 2021–present 
 Member of Tamil Nadu State Planning Commission: 2021–present 
 Chairman of TN Legislative Estimates Committee: 2021–present 
 Secretary of DMK NRI Wing: 2021–2022
 Member of TN Public Accounts Committee: 2012-13; 2019–21; 2021-present (as ex-officio)
 Senate Member of Tamil University: 2019-2021
 Member of TN Public Undertakings Committee: 2012-13; 2015–16 
 Member of TN Estimates Committee: 2011-12; 2014–15; 2021-present (as Chairman)
 Senate Member of Madras University: 2011-13
 Chairman of Kings College of Engg-Pudukkottai: 2003-16

Elections contested

References 

Living people
1976 births
Tamil Nadu MLAs 2011–2016
Tamil Nadu MLAs 2016–2021
Tamil Nadu MLAs 2021–2026